The Asian snake-eyed skink (Ablepharus pannonicus) is a species of skink. It is found in Georgia, southern Turkmenistan, southern Tajikistan, Uzbekistan, Kyrgyzstan, western Azerbaijan, eastern Iran, Iraq, Oman, Afghanistan, Pakistan, Jordan, Syria, the United Arab Emirates, northwestern India, and Cyprus.

References
Blanford, W.T. 1874 Note on Ablepharus pusillus. Ann. Mag. nat. Hist. (4) 14: 461
Fitzinger, L. 1824 Über Ablepharus pannonicus eine neue Eidechse aus Ungarn. Verh. Ges. naturf. Berlin 1 297-302
Gray, J.E. 1839 Catalogue of the slender-tongued saurians, with descriptions of many new genera and species. Ann. Mag. Nat. Hist.  (1) 2: 331-337 (287-293)

External links

Ablepharus
Reptiles described in 1824
Reptiles of Afghanistan
Reptiles of Azerbaijan
Reptiles of Central Asia
Reptiles of Pakistan
Reptiles of the Maldives
Taxa named by Leopold Fitzinger